The Kurdistan Football Association is the football governing body in Iraqi Kurdistan controlling the Kurdistan national football team. It also oversees the Kurdistan Premier League, Kurdistan Cup and Kurdistan Super Cup.

Official Kurdistan FA Emblem
The Kurdistan FA emblem was designed by Kurdish artist Rawand Sirwan Nawroly based in London-UK in the year 2005. The emblem represents the Kurdistan flag colours, where the red represents the Kurdish Newroz fire, the yellow represents the Kurdish sun and the green represents the green Kurdistan scenery.

President Kurdistan Football Association

References

External links
 Kurdistan FA Official Site

Iraqi Kurdistan
Football in Iraq
Football in Kurdistan
Sports organizations established in 2006